The Blue Bird Corporation (originally known as the Blue Bird Body Company) is an American bus manufacturer headquartered in Fort Valley, Georgia.  Best known for its production of school buses, the company has also manufactured a wide variety of other bus types, including transit buses, motorhomes, and specialty vehicles such as mobile libraries and mobile police command centers.  Currently, Blue Bird concentrates its product lineup on school buses, school pupil activity buses (SPAB) and specialty vehicle derivatives.

Blue Bird Body Company was founded in 1932 in Fort Valley, Georgia, as A.L. Luce closed his automobile dealership to concentrate exclusively on bus production.  Remaining under family control into the early 1990s, Blue Bird changed hands several times in the 2000s; in February 2015, it became a publicly owned company (with previous owner Cerberus Capital Management holding a 58% share).

History

1927–1930s 
As the second quarter of the 20th century began, Albert Luce Sr. was an entrepreneur who developed some of earliest purpose-built school buses, transitioned from wagons.  What is now Blue Bird Corporation began life as a side project in a Ford Motor Company dealership in Perry, Georgia. Along with the dealership in Perry, Luce owned the Ford franchise in Fort Valley, Georgia, a rural farming community south of Macon.

In 1925, Luce sold a customer a Ford Model T with a wooden bus body; the customer sought to use the bus to transport his workers. Due to a combination of unsatisfactory construction quality of the bus body and the rough conditions of the rural Georgia roads, the wooden bus body started to disintegrate before the customer had finished paying for the vehicle.  Driven to produce an improved design to sell to his customers, Luce sought input to develop a stronger bus body capable of surviving unimproved roads. In place of wood, Luce constructed his bus body from steel and sheet metal; wood was used as a secondary material. Completed in 1927, the bus was put into use as a school bus.

While buses would initially remain a side project for Luce (with only nine bus bodies produced between 1929 and 1931), the onset of the Great Depression would change his company forever. Following a 95% decline in car sales in 1931, Luce sold both of his Ford dealerships, using the $12,000 proceeds from the sale to begin his own company, concentrating solely on bus production. Inspired to begin production in order to support the local economy, Luce also felt school buses would be a necessary resource as part of the shift towards consolidated schools.

The early use of farm wagons on a part-time basis soon evolved into purpose-built school bus products, each with economy and function as major priorities. In 1937, the company began production of full-steel bus bodies, an innovation which soon replaced the wooden bodies which were then in common use around the United States.

In a 1939 conference, Blue Bird engineers contributed to the selection of school bus yellow, still in use today.

Blue Bird Number One 

Completed in 1927, the first bus completed by A.L. Luce was sold to a customer and put into use as a school bus. Following the establishment of Blue Bird Body Company in 1932, the bus became retroactively known as Blue Bird "Number One". In 1946, the bus was reacquired by the Luce family; as part of the restoration, the body was placed on a Ford Model TT chassis, undergoing a second restoration in the 1970s.

In 2008, Blue Bird "Number One" was donated to the Henry Ford Museum, marking the 100th anniversary of the Model T Ford and the 80th anniversary of its construction.

Alongside the 1948 Blue Bird All American, a replica of Blue Bird Number One sits on the Blue Bird factory floor in Fort Valley.

1940s
By the 1940s, the demand for school buses expanded the presence of Blue Bird from rural Georgia to multiple states across the Southern United States. Following World War II, several changes across the country further created a need for school buses. In all but the most remote rural communities, centralized schools (with the graded class structure of urban schools) had succeeded one-room schoolhouses. In metropolitan areas, urban populations began to move into suburbs. Depending on location, the practice of walking to school had become increasingly impractical (particularly as students progressed into high school). At the end of the decade, the baby-boom generation began their education, having an impact across the education system for the next 30 years.

Near the end of 1945, the company suffered a major setback, as its Fort Valley factory was destroyed by fire (nearly claiming the life of A.L. Luce). While the factory building was burned to the ground, a significant amount of equipment was salvaged along with a number of buses on the assembly line. Production was restarted on a makeshift assembly line on other company property, with some work completed under tents. The Fort Valley factory was rebuilt by the spring of 1946, following several challenges; while building materials themselves were no longer rationed, the ability to secure large quantities of beams, trusses, and sheetmetal remained a formidable task.

Following a 1946 heart attack, A.L. Luce began to hand over day-to-day operations of Blue Bird to his three sons. By the end of the decade, the company became the seventh-largest school bus manufacturer in the United States.

World War II production 
Following the outbreak of World War II, school bus production went on hiatus; Blue Bird produced buses for the U.S. Navy. As steel was heavily rationed, company engineers were required to re-engineer the body designs, using wood as part of the body structure.

Alongside its buses for the Navy, Blue Bird also produced ambulance buses. Intended for mass evacuations, the vehicles were fitted with four stretchers.

All American

 
In 1948, on a trip to Europe, A.L. Luce and his son George attended the 1948 Paris Auto Show. After viewing a GM-chassis forward-control bus on display, Luce sought to buy a similar bus chassis to produce with a Blue Bird body. Unable to secure a chassis, Luce instead purchased the display vehicle, importing it to the United States.

After reverse-engineering the chassis design (to modify American-produced vehicles), Blue Bird completed its first forward-control prototype in 1949, naming it the All American. In 1950, the All American entered full-scale production. For 1952, Blue Bird became the first school bus manufacturer to produce its own chassis (rather than from outside suppliers). With the exception of the van-based Micro Bird, Blue Bird builds the chassis of each bus its produces.

Currently in its sixth generation, the Blue Bird All American is the longest-running bus model line. While not the first forward-control school bus (the Crown Supercoach was introduced in 1932), the All American would become one of the designs to widely expand its use, leading its wider use by school districts and school bus operators throughout the United States and Canada. Along with the Blue Bird Conventional (and the later Blue Bird Vision), many Blue Bird body designs would share design elements with the All American, including the TC/2000, TC/1000, APC and CS commercial buses, and Wanderlodge recreational vehicle.

1950s 
In 1950, A.L. Luce retired from daily operations of Blue Bird, with operations of the company handled by his three sons; A.L. "Buddy" Luce Jr. became company president and general manager; George Luce oversaw engineering and Joseph Luce overseeing production and assembly. The same year, the company began assembly of a second product line, as the All American entered full-scale production. In an effort to guarantee year-round demand, Blue Bird turned to exports for its buses, entering Central America and South America.

During the late 1950s, several changes were made to the body design of Blue Bird buses. In 1957, the body underwent a complete redesign, including a higher roofline and flatter body sides; with several revisions, the current Blue Bird Vision and All American continue to use this body. As an option, a "high-headroom" body was introduced, raising interior height to 77 inches.

1960s
At the beginning of the 1960s, Blue Bird stood as the fourth-largest manufacturer of school buses in the United States. To accommodate the added demand, the Luce brothers added several production facilities to supplement the Fort Valley, Georgia plant. In 1958, Blue Bird Canada was opened in Brantford, Ontario. In 1962, Blue Bird Midwest was opened in Mount Pleasant, Iowa.

At the beginning of the decade, Blue Bird introduced its roofline brand emblem, becoming the first bus manufacturer to do so. In 1962, Blue Bird introduced a panoramic windshield design, used on the All American through 2013 (and still on use on the Vision). In the early 1960s, Blue Bird introduced its long-running company slogan: "Your Children's Safety is Our Business", appearing in company advertising (and inside bus bodies) into the 1990s.

Company founder A.L. Luce died in 1962. Shortly after, the three Luce sons sought to diversify the company product line, fearing that demand for school bus production would eventually recede; while the baby boom generation affected student populations, the generation (as a whole) would complete high school shortly after 1980.

In 1965, the company launched bus assembly outside of North America for the first time, opening Blue Bird Central America in Guatemala. While assembling the bodies of the Conventional and All American, Blue Bird Central America lowered production and maintenance costs by using locally sourced chassis (from Mercedes-Benz, Hino, Nissan Diesel, and Toyota) in place of sharing components from the United States.

Wanderlodge 

In 1963, the first major Blue Bird venture outside of school buses made its debut. Named the Blue Bird Transit Home (re-branded as Wanderlodge in 1968), it was a $12,000 luxury recreational vehicle based on the All American type. Using the heavy-duty frame and all-steel body to its advantage, the vehicle was marketed as higher-quality than other RVs of the time; the interior was largely built to order. For over 25 years of production, the Wanderlodge developed a loyal customer base, including celebrities and heads of state among their owners.

1970s 
In the 1970s, Blue Bird further diversified its product line, entering the transit bus segment. In 1976, the City Bird was introduced as a rear-engine variant of the All American developed for smaller mass-transit routes.

During the decade, the design of small school buses evolved into a dedicated vehicle (away from adaptations of automobiles). While designs based on cutaway vans were not invented by the company, the 1975 Micro Bird introduced several key features retained by van-based buses today. Along with a full-height entry door, the Micro Bird added windows forward of the entry door (to aid loading-zone visibility). The 1977 Mini Bird used the chassis of the GM P30 stepvan; slightly larger than the Micro Bird, the model line shared the body width of the full-size Conventional and All American.

During the 1970s, Blue Bird introduced the "Handy Bus" option package. Available on any model line from the Micro Bird to the All American, the Handy Bus option featured a wheelchair lift and side door and onboard wheelchair accommodations.

1980s 

By 1980, Blue Bird would become the highest-volume school bus manufacturer in the United States, with over 20 times the yearly sales of only two decades prior. Despite the added presence of the company, as an entire industry, school bus manufacturing was in turmoil due to several factors. While the volatile economy of the time was impossible to foresee, many of the early 1960s predictions of the Luce brothers had largely come true. By the early 1980s, the baby-boom generation had completed its secondary education, leveling off student population growth. No longer provided with a supplemental source of demand, the manufacturing segment was becoming saturated by the end of the 1970s. From 1979 to 1982, three of the six largest school bus manufacturers—Carpenter, Superior, and Ward—would file for bankruptcy.

To preserve sales, Blue Bird began the use of financing for bus acquisitions in 1984. The unprecedented strategy proved successful, with sales increasing further in the mid-1980s; as the highest-selling bus manufacturer, nearly one out of every three new school buses was a Blue Bird.

While the 1980s would prove successful for Blue Bird in school bus production, the company saw mixed results in other segments. After 10 years of weak sales, the Blue Bird City Bird was discontinued in 1986. Despite volatile sales in recreational vehicles, the Wanderlodge remained successful, accounting for nearly one in five Blue Bird vehicles sold. To better compete with more modern designs, Blue Bird began to differentiate the Wanderlodge from the All American school bus with several exterior restylings in the late 1980s. The final Wanderlodge to share a body and chassis with the All American was produced in 1990.

During the end of the 1980s, the Blue Bird product line saw several changes. While the All American had been offered in a rear-engine configuration since 1961, a version with a company-sourced chassis was first introduced in 1988. Introduced in late 1987, the TC/2000 (see below) became the first new full-size Blue Bird bus in nearly 30 years. As a running change during 1989 production, Blue Bird introduced a new generation of the All American (redesigned for the first time since 1957). Alongside a redesigned drivers' compartment, the All American received a new set of engine offerings.

Management changes 
Since its founding in 1932, the operations of Blue Bird were overseen either by A.L. Luce or his three sons. In 1984, the board of directors was expanded outside of the family for the first time; in 1986, the company hired Paul Glaske, president of Marathon LeTourneau (a Texas-based heavy equipment manufacturer). Glaske oversaw day-to-day operations of the company, while the sons of Buddy and Joseph Luce worked elsewhere in company management.

TC/2000 

The transit-style school bus product line was expanded from one to two in 1987, as Blue Bird introduced the Blue Bird TC/2000. Largely a response to the Wayne Lifestar, the TC/2000 was an effort to secure bids from operators of large fleets, and intended to be priced closely to conventional-style buses. In line with the All American, the TC/2000 used a Blue Bird-made chassis, but with lighter-duty powertrain and suspension components.

The TC/2000 sold well, by 1990, nearly one in ten new school buses sold in the United States was a TC/2000.

1990s 

At the beginning of the 1990s, Blue Bird had secured its position as the highest-volume school bus manufacturer; following the launch of the TC/2000, the company held nearly a 50% market share. After nearly six decades as a family-run company, in 1991, the Luce family decided to put Blue Bird Body Company up for sale. After showing the company to potential buyers through much of 1991, six buyers offered bids. For $397 million, Merrill Lynch Capital Partners purchased an 82% share of Blue Bird in November 1991, changing the name from Blue Bird Body Company to Blue Bird Corporation. Under the terms of the sale, the remaining 18% of the company was equally distributed between Paul Glaske and 14 management employees selected by the Luce family; Buddy and Joseph Luce retired while the rest of the management team was retained.

During the early 1990s, following the success of its school bus product lines, Blue Bird commenced efforts to further diversify its product lines. As a replacement for the City Bird, in 1992, Blue Bird launched the Blue Bird Q-Bus, designed for mass-transit and charter applications. In contrast to the City Bird, the Q-Bus shared no design commonality with a Blue Bird school bus. In addition to the Q-Bus, the APC (All-Purpose Coach) and CS (Commercial Series) were introduced, as commercial buses based on the bodies of the All American and TC/2000; a "shell" version was sold for upfitters as well.

To better compete with more modern designs of luxury recreational vehicles, Blue Bird began to update the design of the Wanderlodge. Following the 1988 introduction of the 102" wide body, the Wanderlodge line was redesigned entirely for 1991 (effectively sharing only Blue Bird emblems with the All American). In 1994, a second version of the Wanderlodge was introduced, as the Wanderlodge BMC debuted. To expand its availability, the Wanderlodge BMC was produced using a chassis from Spartan Motors; a Blue Bird QMC commercial variant was introduced, designed as a mobile workstation. In 1997, Blue Bird expanded into the passenger motorcoach segment, introducing the LTC-40 (Luxury Touring Coach); for 1998, the Wanderlodge LX/LXi were introduced, adapting the LTC body.

In an effort to match demand for its product lines, Blue Bird made several changes to its production facilities, closing Blue Bird East in (in Virginia) in 1992 and opening Blue Bird de Mexico (in Monterrey, Nuevo León) in 1995.

After few major changes to its school bus product lines through the 1990s, in 1999, the Blue Bird All American underwent its second redesign in 10 years. In order to increase forward visibility, the All American was given an all-new chassis (positioning the engine lower), adopting the larger windshield of the TC/2000, and redesigned dashboard and control panels (later used in the TC/2000).

During the late 1990s, Blue Bird Corporation would undergo the first of several ownership changes. After increasing sales each year throughout the second half of the 1990s, Blue Bird was acquired from Merrill Lynch Capital Partners by Henlys Group PLC for $428 million (with Henlys also paying $237 million of Blue Bird company debt). At the time, Henlys sought to expand its operations in North America, with 10% of the company owned by Volvo Group.

Joint ventures 

During the 1990s, Blue Bird would enter into several joint ventures as part of its school bus production, for both small and full-size school buses.

In an effort to supplement the Blue Bird Micro Bird, in 1992, Blue Bird entered into a supply agreement with Quebec-based bus manufacturer Girardin Minibus to supply Blue Birds with Girardin-produced MB-II/MB-IV school buses (branded as Blue Birds) on cutaway van chassis. While configured similar to the Micro Bird, the Blue Bird MB-II/IV by Girardin allowed Blue Bird to offer an updated body design; at the time, Girardin was the sole manufacturer to produce a full cutaway body for single rear-wheel van chassis. The MB-II and MB-IV were sold by Blue Bird until 1999, when they adopted the Girardin branding.

Coinciding with the 1991 redesign of the General Motors medium-duty truck line, General Motors entered into a 10-year supply agreement with Blue Bird, starting early in 1992, as a 1993 model. Under the agreement, the Chevrolet/GMC B7 would only be sold to Blue Bird. Blue Bird offered a choice of other cowled chassis (Ford B700/B800, International 3700, 3800, and later Freightliner FS-65). The CV200 was produced through 2002. The 2002s were considered 2003 models.

Environmentally friendly buses 
In place of bringing all-new product lines to production, during the 1990s, Blue Bird explored several methods of reducing the environmental impact of school buses, with several methods reaching production. In 1991, Blue Bird developed the first school bus powered by compressed natural gas (CNG), an All American Rear Engine. In 1995, Blue Bird began a collaboration with John Deere to produce school buses with CNG engines, lasting into the 2000s; along with the All American, CNG engines were produced for the TC/2000.

In 1996, Blue Bird debuted the Envirobus 2000 concept school bus. Derived loosely from the Q-Bus, the Envirobus served loosely as a testbed for safety-related technology along with the viability of CNG-powered school buses.

Along with alternative-fuel buses, Blue Bird became the first school bus manufacturer to develop fully electric school buses; during the 1990s, technology limited its development to the prototype stage. In 1994, the company developed a battery-powered school bus in an effort with Westinghouse Electronic Systems for a school district in California. In 1996, Blue Bird collaborated with Electrosource, Inc in an effort to design a battery system intended for buses.

2000s

While the late 1990s were calmer than the late 1970s for the school bus industry, it still remained a time of relative turmoil for school bus manufacturers; this would carry into the 2000s. Several school bus manufacturers underwent acquisition or changed hands (AmTran and Thomas Built Buses); by 2001, several others (Crown Coach, Carpenter, Gillig, Wayne) would end school bus production forever. Instead of being family-run companies, school bus manufacturers were now owned by larger companies with ties to truck manufacturing. For Blue Bird, a large stake of the company was owned by the Volvo Group, the largest bus manufacturer in the world. However, during the early 2000s, due to financial difficulties of its other parent company, Blue Bird was sold from Henlys in 2004. In 2006, Blue Bird was acquired through a bankruptcy filing by Cerberus Capital Management. Looking to develop its entries in the transportation sector, Blue Bird was paired with North American Bus Industries (NABI) and Optima Bus Corporation by Cerberus.

At the beginning of the 2000s, Blue Bird sought to modernize its aging transit bus line; the Q-Bus was nearly a decade old and the CS and APC coaches were essentially commercial versions of the All American and TC/2000 school buses. For 2002, the 96-inch wide Q-Bus was replaced by the 102-inch wide Xcel102 and the CS and APC lines were retired. In 2003, the company entered the low-floor segment with the introduction of the UltraLF and UltraLMB.

As the number of full-size school bus manufacturers had been cut from seven to three from 1990 to 2000, Blue Bird began on making its school bus products more competitive during the early part of the decade. Following the substantial update of the All American in 1999, Blue Bird discontinued the slow-selling TC/1000 in 2001 and consolidated the TC/2000 with the All American early in 2004.

However, the largest change came in 2003, as Blue Bird sought to replace the CV200. While initially developed to use the Ford F-650 Super Duty chassis, the Vision underwent a major change before its release. In a major break from precedent, Blue Bird did not use an existing truck manufacturer for the chassis, instead developing its own version from the ground up. While the Vision used the same bus body as the long-running Conventional, engineering changes were made to optimize forward visibility.

As part of its acquisition by Cerberus, Blue Bird gradually saw itself positioned exclusively into yellow school bus production, its largest market. In 2007, the Xcel102 was discontinued and the low-floor UltraLF/LMB product lines were added to NABI. In a controversial move, the rights to the Wanderlodge luxury motorhome were sold to Complete Coach Works; production ended in 2009.

In commemoration of the 80th anniversary of the construction the first Blue Bird bus and the centennial of the Model T Ford, the Luce family donated the restored vehicle to The Henry Ford Museum in 2008. Dubbed "Blue Bird #1", it is the oldest known surviving school bus in the United States.

With resources dedicated solely towards school bus production, the Vision saw a major update for 2008. In addition to a new dashboard, it received a new cowl with larger headlights and grille. For 2009, the company expanded alternative-fuel options as it introduced a propane-fuel variant of the Vision; it was powered by a General Motors 8.1L V8. For 2010, the All American was given a complete update, marking some of the largest changes to the Blue Bird body design in over 50 years; along with a complete redesign of the roof, windshield, and rear entry, the interior received a ground-up redesign.

With the streamlining of bus production, the number of production facilities utilized by the company has been reduced. Blue Bird de Mexico was closed in 2001 and Blue Bird Midwest in Mount Pleasant, Iowa was closed in 2002. In 2010, Blue Bird North Georgia was closed, consolidating all bus production back to company headquarters in Fort Valley.

In October 2009, Blue Bird further streamlined its bus production as it entered into a second joint venture with Canadian school bus manufacturer Girardin Minibus. Dubbed "Micro Bird, Inc.", all small bus production was consolidated at the Girardin facilities in Quebec, Canada; consequently, all Blue Bird production is now limited to full-size conventional and transit buses. The 2010 Micro Bird was the last Blue Bird bus to use a non-Blue Bird chassis.

2010s

Following the consolidation of Blue Bird production to the Vision and All American school buses (and vehicles derived from them), during the 2010s, a number of changes were phased in. In following with the popularity with the LPG/propane autogas version of the Blue Bird Vision bus, a version powered by a Ford V10 and equipped with a ROUSH CleanTech propane autogas fuel system was introduced in 2011 (as the original General Motors V8 engines were no longer in production); in addition, the Vision received a dashboard and steering column shared with the All American.

In late 2012, Blue Bird unveiled a redesigned 2014 All American series (code-named the T3 Series), which would replace versions introduced in 1999 and 2008 produced concurrently. Distinguished by a redesigned (rounder) roof, the new All American has increased parts commonality with the Vision. In October 2013, the 2015 Vision was introduced. Along with clear-lens headlights and a new grille, propane-fueled versions gained the option of an extended-range 98-gallon fuel tank. Company owner Cerberus Capital sold off the majority of its transportation holdings, including NABI and Optima to Canadian bus builder New Flyer; Blue Bird remained under Cerberus ownership.

In late 2013, Blue Bird entered a different segment of school transportation as it introduced Blue Bird Connect™, a GPS-based fleet management software system co-developed with Synovia Solutions. While designed as an integrated system as an option for any Blue Blue school bus, Blue Bird Connect™ was also intended for retrofit to existing fleets of school buses as well, regardless of brand.

Though produced by Girardin under the Micro Bird joint venture, in late 2014, the company introduced the Micro Bird T-Series, a Girardin-bodied Type A school bus; it is the first school bus body ever produced for the Ford Transit in North America. Largely due to the Ford-derived chassis design, Blue Bird predicts a 20% fuel economy increase over its E-Series MB/G5 counterpart. In 2014, Blue Bird introduced the Sigma, an all-new transit bus. While developed solely for export, the Sigma derived its chassis configuration and drivetrain from the All American.

In September 2014, the ownership of Blue Bird underwent another transition. Texas-based venture capital firm Hennessy Capital Acquisition Corporation purchased a $255 million stake of the company from Cerberus affiliate The Traxis Group. As part of the acquisition, Cerberus/Traxis would retain majority ownership; the Blue Bird leadership team remained in place. Although Cerberus remains the majority owner of Blue Bird with a 58% share of the company, in late February 2015, Blue Bird became the first stand-alone school bus manufacturer to become publicly traded on NASDAQ.

By 2015, Blue Bird ranked as the leading provider of propane autogas powered school buses through a partnership with ROUSH CleanTech, which provides propane autogas fuel systems for the buses. At this time, the Propane Education & Research Council (PERC) estimated that between school districts and private fleets, 11,000 propane school buses had been purchased in the United States.

In September 2015, Blue Bird further expanded its non-diesel fuel offerings as the company introduced a gasoline-fueled variant of the Vision, starting with 2016 production The first gasoline-fueled full-size school bus since the discontinuation of the 2002 Blue Bird CV200, it is powered by the same Ford V10 used by the propane-fueled variant of the Vision. At the end of 2018, Blue Bird produced the 5,000th gasoline-powered version of the Vision.

In January 2017, Blue Bird announced it would begin development of a Zero Emission Vehicle (ZEV) school bus with the Vehicle-to-Grid (V2G) technology. This development work is being supported by a $4.4 million grant from the U.S. Department of Energy, as well as additional support from other entities, bringing together just over $9 million in funds. The project will result in eight ZEV V2G school buses being deployed in California. After unveiling fully electric versions of the Micro Bird G5 and All American in late 2017, Blue Bird delivered its first production electric school buses in September 2018.

2020s 
On May 10 2022, Bluebird announced its entry into a new commercial product line. At the Expo Trade Center, Bluebird unveiled a Class 5 and Class 6 EV Truck chassis that was intended for use on a delivery truck body. This was produced in collaboration with Lightning eMotors, a Colorado-based manufacturer of electric powertrains and complete zero-emission vehicle solutions. Bluebird plans to launch production of its Class 5-6 EV chassis in late 2023 at its manufacturing facility in Fort Valley, Georgia.

Products
In addition to school, activity, and commercial applications, Blue Bird buses have been custom-built for unique applications such as bloodmobiles, mobile libraries, and public safety command centers.

School buses

Other vehicles

Exports
Blue Bird have also built a number of buses for the United Kingdom market, with 62 Blue Bird buses being exported to the UK between 1992 and 2007. Most of the vehicles exported were right hand drive variants of the Blue Bird All American and the Blue Bird Q-Bus. Various local councils, such as Staffordshire County Council and West Sussex County Council, imported a large number of Blue Bird school buses for their own school routes; FirstGroup were the largest private customer in the United Kingdom, ordering eighteen All Americans in 2002.

In addition to school buses, a single low-floor city bus, known as the Blue Bird LFCC9, was built in late 2003. The 29-seater midibus, registered NK53TJV, received the then-popular Plaxton Pointer 2 bodywork and entered service with Arriva North East.

Prototypes

Company timeline

Manufacturing and assembly
Traditionally, school buses such as those produced by Blue Bird consist of components purchased from various outside suppliers and parts which are manufactured in-house to the company's specifications. These two categories of parts are then typically assembled into bodies which can be mounted onto chassis which have often been variations of those used in a myriad of truck applications. Alongside its role of vehicle assembly, the Blue Bird facility in Fort Valley, Georgia, also manufactured parts used for all company facilities to produce vehicles. Blue Bird Wanderlodges were manufactured in an adjacent facility in Fort Valley, including Wanderlodge Wayside Park, a tree-shaded motor home park to accommodate Wanderlodges visiting for service.

Blue Bird currently operates its Fort Valley manufacturing facility as its sole point of assembly; Micro Birds are assembled in the Girardin factory in Drummondville, Quebec, Canada. In the past, the company held four factories (and the Wanderlodge factory) in the United States, two facilities in Canada (separate from Girardin), one in Mexico, and one in Guatemala. In the 1980s, Blue Bird exited production in Central America; during the 2000s, the company gradually wound down its number of factories as the company centralized production and consolidated its model lines to school buses and their derivatives. In 2010, Blue Bird North Georgia (LaFayette, Georgia) was closed.

Branding

Company name
The exact origin of the Blue Bird company name is unknown; several theories are known to exist.  Most commonly, A.L. Luce was perceived to have been hesitant about using the family surname for the company out of fears of mispronunciation (i.e., a Luce bus = "loose bus").

In another version, when showing a blue and yellow demonstrator unit to school officials, Luce overheard the positive reception of school children who had seen the bus, who nicknamed it "a pretty blue bird", and the name was chosen for the company.  Conversely, since the end of the 1930s, yellow would become the exterior color associated with American-manufactured school buses.

Roof emblem
The Blue Bird company emblem is a silhouette profile of the company namesake bluebird; the design has been painted on the roof on many of its buses since the beginning of the 1960s.  Later in the decade, the company began to combine the emblem with a stripe painted on the roof of the bus, known as a "streamer".  On school buses, the emblem and streamers are black (if specifications allow for their use); the streamer is also offered as an option.  On non-school buses, the emblem and streamer are also offered in various colors, coordinated to the design of the bus.

The combination of roof emblems and streamers would come into use by other school manufacturers as a design feature; the latter would become most closely associated with Blue Bird and its roof emblem.

In 2013, the roof streamer was redesigned for the first time.  To simplify manufacturing, the roof-length streamer was replaced by a single design shared across Blue Bird and Micro Bird buses (introduced for 2014 production), with three versions, distinguished by fuel type.  Diesel-fuel buses retained the previous black design, with propane-fuel vehicles receiving a green emblem and streamer; the gasoline-fuel Vision received a blue-colored design.

For 2019 production, Blue Bird retired the roof streamer design.  As the company introduced electric-powered buses for 2020, an electric cord-style streamer was introduced with a green Blue Bird emblem (distinguishing it from propane-fuel buses).

See also

School bus
North American Bus Industries
List of school bus manufacturers

References

External links

Blue-Bird.com Blue Bird Corporation official website
Blue Bird Corporation official Facebook Page 
Blue Bird Corporation official Twitter Page 
School Bus Fleet magazine official website
Federal Motor Vehicle Safety Standards (FMVSS) for school buses
U.S. Bureau of Transportation Statistics
Technical support forum for the Blue Bird Wanderlodge

 
School bus manufacturers
Manufacturing companies based in Georgia (U.S. state)
Companies based in Peach County, Georgia
Vehicle manufacturing companies established in 1927
Cerberus Capital Management companies
Companies listed on the Nasdaq
1927 establishments in Georgia (U.S. state)